Nammoora Hammeera is a 1990 Indian Kannada-language romantic drama film directed by Peraala and written by Vijaya Bapineedu. It is a remake of the 1986 Tamil movie Amman Kovil Kizhakale.

The film stars Ambareesh, Suman Ranganathan, Devaraj and Mukhyamantri Chandru. The film, produced by B. H. Bucchi Reddy, was widely appreciated for its songs tuned by Hamsalekha and lead actors performances upon release.

Cast 

 Ambareesh 
 Suman Ranganathan
 Devaraj
 C. R. Simha
 Mukhyamantri Chandru
 Umashree
 Dinesh
 Disco Shanti
 Sathyajith
 Hemanth Kumar
 Sathyabhama
 Kunigal Nagabhushan

Soundtrack 
The music of the film was composed and lyrics were written by Hamsalekha and the entire soundtrack was received extremely well. Audio was released on Lahari Music.

References 

1990 films
1990s Kannada-language films
Indian romantic drama films
Kannada remakes of Tamil films
Films scored by Hamsalekha
1990 romantic drama films